The 1991 season is the 69th season of competitive football in Ecuador.

National leagues

Serie A
Champion: Barcelona (11th title)
International cup qualifiers:
1992 Copa Libertadores: Barcelona, Valdez
1992 Copa CONMEBOL: El Nacional
Relegated: Macará (after the first stage); Juvenil (after the second stage)

Serie B
Winner:
First Stage: Green Cross (1st title)
Second Stage: Aucas (2nd title)
Promoted: Green Cross (after the first stage); Aucas (after the second stage)
Relegated: Audaz Octubrino, Deportivo Quevedo

Segunda
Winner: 2 de Marzo (1st title)
Promoted: 2 de Marzo, Santos

National team

Senior team
The Ecuador national team played eight matches in 1991: four at the Copa America, and four friendlies.

Copa América

Ecuador played in 1991 Copa America held in Chile. For the Group Stage, they were drawn into Group B with Brazil, Uruguay, Colombia, and Bolivia. They finished 4th in the group and didn't advance to the Final Round.

Friendlies

Births
January 27 - Juan Govea, footballer

External links
 National leagues details on RSSSF

 
1991